Șuletea is a commune in Vaslui County, Western Moldavia, Romania. It is composed of four villages: Fedești, Jigălia, Rășcani and Șuletea.

Natives
 Virgil Caraivan

References

Communes in Vaslui County
Localities in Western Moldavia

ro:Șuletea, Vaslui